Xie Saike (born 1961/62) is a male former table tennis player from China. He was the 1981 World Champion in mixed doubles.

Career

Xie won the 1982 Asian Games singles title in New Delhi, India.

Xie was twice runner-up at these Championships in 1982 (Jakarta) and 1980 (Calcutta, now Kolkata). He finally won gold in three categories (single, doubles (men and mixed)) at the 7th Asian Championships held in 1983 in Islamabad, Pakistan.

Xie was twice runner-up in doubles (men) at the 1981 World Championships in Novi Sad and 1983 World Championships in Tokyo.

He was the runner-up at the World Cup held in Kuala Lumpur, Malaysia in 1981.

Beijing Olympics
Xie was one of the torch runners in Nanning for the 2008 Summer Olympics in Beijing.

References

Chinese male table tennis players
Living people
Year of birth uncertain
Asian Games medalists in table tennis
Table tennis players at the 1982 Asian Games
Asian Games gold medalists for China
Asian Games bronze medalists for China
Medalists at the 1982 Asian Games
1960s births
Table tennis players from Guangxi
People from Liuzhou
World Table Tennis Championships medalists